Facundo Soloa (born 4 November 1996) is an Argentine footballer who plays for Atlético de Rafaela as a midfielder.

References

External links

1996 births
Living people
Association football midfielders
Argentine footballers
Primera Nacional players
Argentine Primera División players
Atlético de Rafaela footballers
Guillermo Brown footballers